The Ford Cougar 406 is a concept car for the Ford Thunderbird built by Dean Jeffries for Ford. The Cougar featured Mercedes 300 SL-type gullwing doors, and was originally painted in Candy Apple Red. The car was unveiled at the 1962 Chicago Auto Show. The original was a 3/8-scale model from 1956. This was the second car to be under the Cougar nameplate. The car has 405 horsepower. On the car there was swing-up headlights on the front fenders.

In 1963, the Cougar was used in Frederick Brisson's film version of his Broadway comedy hit "Under the Yum Yum Tree".

References

Cougar 406